Löyöp  (formerly known as Lehalurup) is an Oceanic language spoken by about 240 people, on the east coast of Ureparapara Island in the Banks Islands of Vanuatu. It is distinct from Lehali, the language spoken on the west coast of the same island.

The language was originally native to the Rowa Islands, having been brought to Urepapapara around the 1930s when a tsunami struck the Reef Islands and forced the speakers to relocate.

Name
The name Löyöp  refers to the area called "Divers' Bay" in English, in the eastern part of Ureparapara. It derives from a Proto-Torres-Banks form *loroβi. The name Lehalurup once used by certain authors (e.g. Tryon) is of unknown etymology: it may result from a transcription error, possibly under the influence of neighbouring Lehali (also of unclear origin).

Phonology
Löyöp phonemically contrasts 16 consonants and 11 vowels.

Consonants

Vowels
These are ten short monophthongs , and one diphthong .

Grammar
The system of personal pronouns in Löyöp contrasts clusivity, and distinguishes four numbers (singular, dual, trial, plural).

Spatial reference in Löyöp is based on a system of geocentric (absolute) directionals, which is in part typical of Oceanic languages, and yet innovative.

References

Bibliography

 .

External links
 Audio recordings in the Löyöp language (Pangloss Collection)

Banks–Torres languages
Languages of Vanuatu
Vulnerable languages